In Greek mythology, Agenor (Ancient Greek: Ἀγήνωρ or Αγήνορι Agēnor; English translation: 'heroic, manly') was a son of King Pleuron of Aetolia and Xanthippe, and grandson of Aetolus. His siblings were Stratonice, Sterope and Laophonte. Agenor married his cousin Epicaste, the daughter of Calydon, who became by him the mother of Porthaon and Demonice.  According to Pausanias, Thestius, the father of Leda, was likewise a son of this Agenor.

Genealogical tree

Notes

References 

 Apollodorus, The Library with an English Translation by Sir James George Frazer, F.B.A., F.R.S. in 2 Volumes, Cambridge, MA, Harvard University Press; London, William Heinemann Ltd. 1921. . Online version at the Perseus Digital Library. Greek text available from the same website.
Pausanias, Description of Greece with an English Translation by W.H.S. Jones, Litt.D., and H.A. Ormerod, M.A., in 4 Volumes. Cambridge, MA, Harvard University Press; London, William Heinemann Ltd. 1918. . Online version at the Perseus Digital Library
Pausanias, Graeciae Descriptio. 3 vols. Leipzig, Teubner. 1903.  Greek text available at the Perseus Digital Library.

Princes in Greek mythology
Family of Calyce
Aetolian characters in Greek mythology